Christopher O'Brien was an Irish naval officer of the eighteenth century.

He was of Gaelic origin, descended from the O'Brien dynasty. He served in the Royal Navy rising to the rank of captain. In 1737 he transferred to the Russian Navy where he was appointed to the rank of vice admiral. He was tasked with overseeing a series of reforms in the country's fleet. He was appointed commander of the Kronstadt Naval Base near St Petersburg. He left Russian service in 1742.

References

Bibliography
 Clark, George B. Irish Soldiers in Europe: 17th-19th Century. Mercier Press, 2010.

18th-century Irish people
Irish sailors
Emigrants from the Kingdom of Ireland to the Russian Empire
Irish sailors in the Royal Navy
Year of birth missing
Year of death missing